Bowman's Lodge is a house in Dartford, Kent, England and the location of Bowmans, an area in the north west of Dartford Heath.

The historian John Dunkin wrote in 1844 that:

A poem presented to E.M. Potts at Bowman's Lodge, in around 1834, ran as follows:

In 1779-80 a shop, the Suttling house, stood near Bowman's Lodge, kept by Mr. Powell of the Granby, Dartford, for the purpose of supplying troops with stationery and small stores while they were camped on the heath preparing for a foreign invasion.

Bowman's Lodge was the venue for four cricket matches played between 1795 and 1809 which were given retrospective first-class cricket status. Two matches were held between an England side and a Hampshire team in 1795. A Kent side played England in 1805 and the final top-class match at the ground came in 1809 between England and a Surrey team.  The exact location of the ground on the heath is unknown, though the land opposite the lodge is presently laid out with football pitches and is a possible site of the cricket matches.

For about 60 years, the lodge was home to William Cracroft Fooks QC (1812–99), Barrister at Law, JP for the county of Kent. He was instrumental in the rejection of a proposal to build a ship canal from the Thames to Dartford Creek. He also organised the formation of a volunteer rifle corps in the Dartford area to prepare for a possible invasion of Britain by Napoleon III.

In the late 19th and early 20th centuries gravel was excavated in the area and numerous Palaeolithic flint implements were discovered in Bowman's Lodge Pit, which was located between the house and Chastilian Road. In the 20th century the pit was filled in and returned to heathland.

The lodge is thought to have had connections with Lord Tredegar until well into the 1900s. It was torn down in about 1987 and replaced with two modern dwellings. Swan Lane, the road running past the property, remained a dirt track until the 1980s when it was upgraded and became part of the main signposted route to Crayford from the Dartford Heath junction of the A2.

References

1795 establishments in England
Cricket grounds in Kent
Dartford
Defunct cricket grounds in England
Defunct sports venues in Kent
English cricket venues in the 18th century
History of Kent
Sports venues completed in 1795
Houses in Kent